Printzlau is a surname. Notable people with the surname include:

Jonathan Printzlau (born 1976), Danish tennis player
Leif Printzlau (born 1948), Danish footballer
Olga Printzlau (1891–1962), American screenwriter